Eglinton railway station served the village of Eglinton in County Londonderry in Northern Ireland.

The Londonderry and Coleraine Railway opened the station as Willsborough on 29 November 1852. It was renamed Muff on 1 October 1853, and Eglinton on 1 February 1854.

New station buildings were erected between 1873 and 1875 to designs by the architect John Lanyon.

It closed on 2 July 1973.

Routes

References

External links

Disused railway stations in County Londonderry
Railway stations opened in 1852
Railway stations closed in 1972
1852 establishments in Ireland

Railway stations in Northern Ireland opened in 1852